The Albert Hall is a period Victorian theatre in Llandrindod Wells in Powys, Wales. Originally built as a church hall in 1896, it became a theatre in 1922, with the addition of an art-deco foyer. The exterior of the building, foyer and auditorium remain to this day much as they were then.
 
The town bought the theatre as a community space in 1961. It was Grade II listed in 1985. The early history of building and maintaining the Albert Hall was inextricably bound up with the Ithon Road Presbyterian Church, and it is a tribute to the labour of the small membership of the Church (approximately 100).

History

1890s

In the 1890s, 80 to 90,000 visitors came to Llandrindod each year for spa treatment and rest. Many were Welsh speakers. The Presbyterian Church needed somewhere to hold Welsh language services and social events. Owen Morris Roberts drew up the plans, and church members started fund-raising. The hall was completed in 1896 at a total cost of £2,000. It comprised

– a large open space
– moveable seating for 750 people
– a small stage for choirs to assemble
– a small balcony at the back of the hall, with wooden seats.

The exterior was much as it is today, except for the main doors, canopy and steps. Edward Jenkins, a member of the church, suggested its name – the Albert Hall.

1900s

In 1905, the adjoining church was rebuilt. At the same time, the Albert Hall’s basement was converted into a church schoolroom.

First World War

In 1914, the Royal Army Medical Corps (RAMC) billeted 4,000 men in Llandrindod for training. They used the Hall for events and entertainment. Llandrindod held its second annual eisteddfod in March 1915 at the Albert Hall.

Between the wars

After the war, membership of the church began to decline, and the hall was no longer needed. The committee decided that a theatre and cinema would be of value to the town. So in 1922, The Albert Hall was converted into a theatre and cinema, re-opening on the 23rd July 1923. A foyer, with Art Deco detailing, designed by Owen Morris Roberts & Son was added. The exterior of the building, foyer and auditorium remain to this day much as they were then.

With the advent of “Talkies” – films with sound – in 1929, the Albert Hall discontinued its role as a cinema. The church gave the silent cinematograph unit to Bronllys sanatorium.

It was at this time that the Llandrindod Wells Drama festival was launched. The week-long festival ran every year (except for the war years) until 2013. But other than that, the Albert Hall, like the town, saw a downturn in its fortunes.

Second World War

In 1939, Llandrindod again became a training base for thousands of troops. With lectures in the day, and entertainment every evening, the Albert Hall was in full use once more. Many of the troops who graced the stage would become household names. But of course, as the troops withdrew at the end of the war, so the audiences dwindled.

1950s

The church continued to hold Welsh services in the Albert Hall until 1951. Then in 1958, a local firm, Campbell & Edwards bought it for use as an auction house.

1960s

In 1962, the townspeople of Llandrindod Wells bought the Albert Hall for £2,000. A management committee, composed of representatives from local organisations would run the theatre. The community raised more money, but the necessary repairs and running costs took up most of it.

1970s

With help from the Welsh Arts Council, the Committee drew up a programme of improvements. It would cost £20,000, and so the fundraising started again.

In 1973, the “Friends of the Albert Hall” fund was launched, and brought in over £1,000 from local organisations. The Committee approached local councils and organisations, and the money was raised. The improvements included a central heating system, rewiring, repainting and decorating. Technical improvements, fire precautions and a new canopy were also added.

1980s and 90s

The local theatre company took over the management of the building. In 1981, the Albert Hall was Grade II listed, in order for the building to be preserved and protected. Regular events included a yearly pantomime, the drama festival and Young Farmers competitions. A bar was created between the kitchen and Lesser Hall, licensed to serve alcohol to audiences.

2000s

In 2007, a £115,000 restoration project began, which included a new roof. It was supported by the Heritage Lottery Fund, the European Union, and other sponsors.

2010s

It was agreed that management of the theatre should revert to a management committee. Shortly after, the Albert Hall Management Committee was re-established. The theatre was registered as a charity (charity number 524464).

Since then, the theatre has undergone further improvement. The original asbestos was removed and the curtains replaced in 2016. A new heating system was installed in 2019, along with upgraded electrics.

2020s

In March 2020, a brand new management committee took over the Albert Hall, and sadly just 2 weeks later, the Hall was closed due to the Covid-19 (Coronavirus) Pandemic. The Albert Hall took part in LightItInRed, and WeMakeEvents, which saw the theatre stand united with thousands of venues, and production companies around the world, excluded from support during the pandemic. The new committee want to bring the hall back to what it was originally built for, to provide a space for local community groups to use.

Throughout 2020, and the beginning of 2021, maintenance work took place, thanks to the generous support of, the local people, Ah Friends, and committee members, as well as the Arts Council of Wales, and Theatres Trust. New toilet facilities were installed, and the dressing rooms were refurbished, as well as many other small, often unseen repair or maintenance tasks. The Albert Hall finally reopened on Saturday 10 July 2021, 476 days, or 68 weeks, after the pandemic forced its closure.

Present Day

The theatre is managed by a voluntary committee consisting of local people and members of local organisations.

The Albert Hall is a community space. Anyone can hire it for their own performance or show. Whilst it is mainly used for theatre productions, it can also accommodate: concerts, eisteddfods, film shows, ceremonies, conferences (theatre-style), and meetings. As well as the auditorium and balcony, there is a small meeting room downstairs. Known as the Lesser Hall, this room is available for small parties, rehearsals, or meetings. It is also used as a dressing room space for productions with a large cast. There are many users of the Albert Hall, including local amateur dramatic groups, Young Farmers clubs, local performers, clubs, schools, touring productions, and shows.

The Albert Hall is a registered charity (Charity Number 524464). Its income is derived from hire fees and fund-raising.  They rely on the support of the community, users, and volunteers to keep the theatre open and up to date. The management committee put on regular fundraising events throughout the year. These include Talent Night in October and the Christmas Singalong in December. The committee has also put on two of its own productions, of well-known musicals, The Addams Family in 2015, and Little Shop of Horrors in 2017. 

In 2021, a small group of committee members, and friends got together, and formed the ‘Ah Players’. So far they have produced three shows, ‘All Together Now!’ in 2021, ‘Here We Go Again!’ and ‘Jesus, Mary, & Joseph’ in 2022. They also featured at Llandrindod’s Carnival in 2022, and will be appearing in more productions, and at events in the future. 

The Albert Hall group of friends, Ah Friends, contributes to the fundraising efforts of the committee.

References

External links

Theatres Trust Database
History Points

Theatres in Wales
Theatre companies in Wales
Grade II listed theatres
Theatres in the United Kingdom
Llandrindod Wells
Buildings and structures in Powys